The Sydney Trocadero was a large art deco dance and concert hall that operated between 1936 and 1971 in Sydney, Australia.  It was the main venue of Big Band jazz orchestras, with the resident Trocadero Orchestra under the baton of Frank Coughlan, and the All Girl Trocadero Band. Often referred to as "The Troc", it was once regarded as the "most glamorous dance palace in Sydney and accommodated up to 2,000 people".  It was the favored venue for university and school 'formals', and hosted many important local rock and pop concerts during the 1960s.

Location
The Trocadero was located on the western side of George Street, south of Bathurst Street, next door to the now demolished Hoyts Regent Theatre.

History
The venue opened with a full-dress gala on 3 April 1936. It was one of a number of venues in Sydney for balls. Others included the Palais Royale, the David Jones Auditorium and the Blaxland Galleries. Art Students' Balls and Artists' Balls continued to be held at the Trocadero through the 1950s and up till the early 1960s over a period when dance music encompassed a wide range of styles including swing and Australian jazz in the early years, to foxtrot, waltz and tango in the later ones.

The Sydney Trocadero was closed on 5 February 1971; the building was demolished and replaced by a modernist cinema complex owned by the Hoyts group.

Cultural references
The closure of the venue is commemorated in the song "Deep Water" by Australian singer-songwriter Richard Clapton.

See also 

107-109 Bathurst Street, Sydney

References

Bibliography
Ford, Joan (1995) Meet me at the Trocadero Cowra, NSW.

External links

Former buildings and structures in Sydney
Theatres in Sydney
Demolished buildings and structures in Sydney
Dance venues